Flatanger is a municipality in Trøndelag county, Norway. It is part of the Namdalen region. The administrative centre of the municipality is the village of Lauvsnes. Other villages include Jøssund, Hasvåg, and Vik.

The  municipality is the 217th largest by area out of the 356 municipalities in Norway. Flatanger is the 326th most populous municipality in Norway with a population of 1,101.

Flatanger is also known for having some of the most difficult sport climbing routes in the world.

General information

Flatanger was established as a municipality in the old Nord-Trøndelag county on 1 January 1871 when it was separated from the large municipality of Fosnes. Initially, Flatanger had 1,472 residents. It is one of the few municipalities in Norway whose boundaries have not changed since it was established.  In 2018, it became part of the new Trøndelag county.

Name
The municipality is likely named after one of the local fjords, but it is not know which exactly which one.

Coat of arms
The coat of arms was granted on 12 October 1990. The official blazon is "Vert, three chevronels embowed argent". This means the arms have a green field (background) and the charge is three chevrons with a slight curve to them. The charge has a tincture of argent which means it is commonly colored white, but if it is made out of metal, then silver is used. The green color was chosen to represent the agriculture industry in the municipality. The design was chosen to represent the bow of a boat, seen from the front, since boats have a great historical significance in this coastal fishing community. The arms were designed by Even Jarl Skoglund.

Churches
The Church of Norway has one parish within the municipality of Flatanger. It is part of the Namdal prosti (deanery) in the Diocese of Nidaros.

Geography
The municipality consists mostly of mainland, but also includes almost 1,400 islands of various sizes. Some of the major islands include Bjørøya, Lauvøya, Villa, Halmøya, and Kvernøya. Ellingråsa Lighthouse is located on the island of Bjørøya and Villa Lighthouse is on Villa. These islands all lie on the south side of the Folda firth. The Namsenfjorden forms part of the northern boundary of the municipality.

Government
All municipalities in Norway, including Flatanger, are responsible for primary education (through 10th grade), outpatient health services, senior citizen services, unemployment and other social services, zoning, economic development, and municipal roads. The municipality is governed by a municipal council of elected representatives, which in turn elect a mayor.  The municipality falls under the Trøndelag District Court and the Frostating Court of Appeal.

Politics
In the 2007 municipal elections, Flatanger had the highest vote for the Venstre party in all of Norway, at 42.9 per cent.

Municipal council
The municipal council of Flatanger is made up of 15 representatives that are elected to four year terms. The party breakdown of the council is as follows:

Mayors
The mayors of Flatanger:

1871–1877: Olaus Vedege 	
1878–1879: Andreas Saxegård 
1880–1883: Bernt H. Solem  
1884–1885: Peder Musum 	
1886–1887: Ole Martin Løfsnes 
1888–1893: Albert Opland (V)
1894–1898: Odin Aune (V)
1899–1901: Albert Opland (V)
1902–1916: Odin Aune (V)
1917–1928: Carl Sitter (V)
1929–1934: Anton Høstland (Bp)
1935–1937: Sigurd Halmøy (KrF)
1938–1940: Øistein Aarseth (V)
1941–1945: Lauritz Sved 
1945–1947: Øistein Aarseth (V)
1948–1951: Anton Høstland (Bp)
1952–1953: Sverre Hustad (Ap)
1954–1955: Ingolf Lindseth 
1956–1961: Carl Gulbrandsen (LL)
1962–1967: Birger Skotnes (LL)
1968–1969: Aage Aagård (Sp)
1970–1973: Otmar Lauvsnes (Sp)
1973–1979: Aage Aagård (Sp)
1980–1987: Øyvind Mårvik (LL)
1988–1995: Ronald Geving (Sp)
1995–1999: Per Bårdsen (Ap)
1999–2003: Trond Strøm (Sp)
2003–2011: Reidar Lindseth (V)
2011–present: Olav Jørgen Bjørkås (Sp)

Attractions

Rock climbing
Flatanger is home to some of the world's hardest sport climbs, particularly in Hanshelleren Cave near town. Change, given the grade 9b+/5.15c+, was first redpointed by Adam Ondra on 4 October 2012. Ondra also redpointed the first 9c climbing route in the world in Flatanger on 3 September 2017. The route was originally named Project Hard by Ondra because of its many difficulties, but after completion—when it was no longer a project—he renamed it Silence.

Notable people
 Ole Konrad Ribsskog (1865 in Flatanger – 1941) a Norwegian teacher and politician, Mayor of  Trondhjem
 Toralf Sandø (1899 in Flatanger – 1970) a Norwegian film director and actor 
 Julie Dahle Aagård (born 1978 in Flatanger) a Norwegian Jazz singer
 Brede Moe (born 1991 in Flatanger) a Norwegian footballer with 180 club caps

References

External links

Municipal fact sheet from Statistics Norway 

 
Municipalities of Trøndelag
1871 establishments in Norway